The Integrated, Intra-Squad Radio (IISR) is a secure handheld 2-way radio, produced by Motorola for the US Marine Corps. Its intended purpose is squad-level communications during urban warfare. The USMC ordered 60,000 radios to be used until replaced by the more complex Joint Tactical Radio System (JTRS) cluster 5 spiral 2 radio in 2013. However, JTRS was cancelled in October 2011. The IISR is similar in form and function to a Motorola XTS 2500i with embedded encryption module, which was essential to provide secure voice communications, especially in war zones.

Sources

Military radio systems of the United States
United States Marine Corps equipment
Military equipment introduced in the 2010s